Bugga is a village in  Pind Dadan Khan Tehsil of Jhelum District in Punjab, Pakistan.

Overview
It is situated on the right bank of River Jhelum and near the M-2 motorway at a distance of 10 km. Presently this area became a part of China-Pakistan Economic Corridor (CPEC).
Bhera is also nearby ro Bugga.

References

Populated places in Jhelum District